Rameses is the ram mascot of the North Carolina Tar Heels. The anthropomorphic version of him  wears a Tar Heels jersey (#5).  Three versions of Rameses appear at UNC sporting events. One is a member of the UNC cheerleading team in an anthropomorphic ram costume; the second is also an anthropomorphic ram costume, and the third is a live Dorset Horn sheep named Rameses who attends Carolina football games with his horns painted Carolina blue.

Origin 
The origin of a ram as North Carolina's mascot dates back to 1924. In 1922, the star fullback, Jack Merritt, was given the nickname "the battering ram" for his performance on the field, as well as for an initiation ritual he created for male freshman students. Vic Huggins, North Carolina's head cheerleader at the time, suggested the idea of a ram mascot to the athletic business manager, Charles T. Woollen, and had the idea approved. Woollen gave Huggins $25 to purchase a  ram. Rameses the First was shipped from Texas, just in time for the pep rally.

The first appearance of Rameses was at a pep rally before the football game against Virginia Military Institute on November 8, 1924.  After the pep rally the ram was taken to Emerson Field. Through three quarters the game was scoreless. Late in the fourth quarter Bunn Hackney was called out to attempt a field goal. Before stepping out on the field he rubbed Rameses' head. Just a few seconds later Hackney kicked a 30-yard field goal that eventually won the game for the Tar Heels; the final score was 3-0. Rameses has been a fixture on the sidelines at UNC football games ever since.  The current Rameses ram is under the care of the Hogan family of Chapel Hill.

The origin of the costumed version of Rameses dates back to the 1987-88 season.  Auditions were held and a senior, Eric Chilton from Mount Airy, North Carolina, was given the honor to be the first mascot.  Since auditions were held in the middle of the school year he only served for half a year and only showed up in a few basketball games in early 1988.  The costume was made locally and looked different from the one used today.

As of Spring 2022, former In-Suit Performer Daniel Wood was hired as the permanent UNC Mascot Coordinator and Coach.

Rameses Jr.
On the evening of October 26, 2015, Rameses Jr., or RJ for short, made his debut during Late Night with  Roy, North Carolina Tar Heels men's basketball's annual  Midnight Madness event. He is an anthropomorphic lamb who wears the number #0.  Brown Walters, the director of spirit programs at UNC Chapel Hill, told The Daily Tar Heel it took a year to come up with the concept of RJ.  RJ was conceived in part to expand the reach of UNC Chapel Hill's spirit program.  RJ's design, featuring a less muscular body, Carolina blue horns, blue eyes and  Jordan-brand apparel, was also developed to appeal to children.  Walters said small children were frightened by the current version of the Rameses costume.

Killing of Rameses XXIII
In February 1996, Rameses XXIII was killed in his pasture at the Hogan farm.  An attacker slashed the ram's throat and cut off its left front leg, stabbing it as many as 10 times along its chest and neck. State veterinarians stated that the slash to its throat was most likely the fatal wound.  Police later charged 26-year-old Scott Wade.  Wade stumbled onto the Hogan farm drunk at the time of the slaying.  Investigators believed Wade killed the ram because he was hungry. Wade was later charged with misdemeanor animal cruelty.

Jason Ray 
On March 23, 2007, Jason Ray, a member of the UNC Chapel Hill cheerleading squad, was struck by a vehicle near a  Hilton Hotel on Route 4 in Fort Lee, New Jersey.  The Tar Heel men's basketball team had advanced to the 2007 East Regional semifinals, and the Fort Lee Hilton was the Tar Heel team hotel.  Ray was walking to a convenience store to buy a burrito and a soda before he was due to portray Rameses in the game against the  USC Trojans.  Ray died on March 26, 2007 at the Hackensack University Medical Center as a result of the injuries sustained in the accident.

Ray was an honors student and was due to graduate that May with a degree in business administration and a minor in religious studies.  He was an Eagle Scout with Troop 38 in Concord, NC, had gone on three missionary trips (Haiti, Honduras, and Puerto Rico) to work with children, had visited the Sistine Chapel, ran with the bulls in Spain, and spent a summer studying in Copenhagen, Denmark. Ray was also an active member of InterVarsity Christian Fellowship, his church choir, and was the lead singer in the band Nine PM Traffic.

Four people received  organ transplants because of Ray's decision to become an  organ donor.

On April 16, 2016,  UNC Hospitals dedicated its transplant clinic to Ray.  An endowment fund, also dedicated to Ray, was started to raise funds for patients unable to pay for their transplants.  The Ray family pledged to raise one million dollars for this endowment fund.

On September 21, 2017, it was announced Rameses and RJ would wear patches commemorating honoring Ray's memory for all sporting events held during the 2017-18 season, starting with the 2017 North Carolina Tar Heels football team's game against  Duke.

In-Suit Mascot Performers

References

External links
 Rameses: a mascot's life, page that followed Rameses around for a day in 1999 and was dedicated to Jason Ray in 2007
 The Jason Ray Foundation

Atlantic Coast Conference mascots
University of North Carolina at Chapel Hill traditions
North Carolina Tar Heels
Fictional sheep
Animal mascots
Mascots introduced in 1924